Gunnar Cederschiöld (Mathias Gunnar Cederschiöld, 30 July 1887 – 21 November 1949) was a Swedish author, image artist and fencer. 

Gunnar Cederschiöld graduated in Gothenburg in 1906, after which he studied painting at Valand Academy there and in Copenhagen. He then studied in Paris at Académie de la Grande Chaumière and as a private student for Théophile Steinlen. As a writer he became known first through letters on Paris to Swedish newspapers, then during and after World War I through lively and vivid depictions which, even when having the character of novels, by their type are skilled journalism. They are collected in a series of books illustrated with Cederschiöld's quickly accomplished drawings.

In 1919 Cederschiöld was managing director of AB France-Afrique in Paris, and for Société genérale des Allumettes in 1927.

He competed in the individual and team épée events at the 1928 Summer Olympics.

Gunnar Cederschiöld was married to the daughter and only child of sociologist Gustaf F. Steffen. The couple had three children.

Bibliography
	Den siste Kergoël Stockholm: Norstedt. 1917. LIBRIS 1650539
	Livstidsfången och andra berättelser' Stockholm: Norstedt. 1918. LIBRIS 1650543
	I skärselden och på andra ställen Stockholm: Hökerberg. 1931. LIBRIS 1352644
	Han blev miljonär : roman. Stockholm: Natur o. kultur 1947. LIBRIS 1390578
	Bland artister och hyggligt folk i Paris Stockholm: Ljus. 1915. LIBRIS 1632234
	I väntan på segern : studier från Frankrike under kriget Lund: Gleerup. 1915. LIBRIS 1632235
	Infödingarna på Manhattan : studier och stämningar från New York Stockholm: Ljus. 1916. LIBRIS 1650541
	Krig och hem : karaktärer, interiörer och äventyr från Frankrike och England Lund: C. W. K. Gleerup. 1916. LIBRIS 1650542
	Negrer : studier och äventyr i Franska Västafrika Stockholm: Norstedt. 1917. LIBRIS 1650545
	Äro vi rustade för det ekonomiska kriget Stockholm: Sv. andelsförl. 1917. LIBRIS 1650548
	Elsass-Lothringen : studier Lund: C. W. K. Gleerup. 1918. LIBRIS 1650540
	Maghreb : nutidsbilder från det gamla moriska väldet i Europa och Afrika Stockholm: Norstedt. 1918. LIBRIS 1650544
	Segraren och några av hans hjälpare Stockholm: Norstedt. 1919. LIBRIS 1650546
	Upp- och nedvända världen Stockholm: Norstedt. 1919. LIBRIS 1650547
	Tretton år med Ivar Kreuger Stockholm: Natur och kultur. 1937. LIBRIS 53697
	Sviker Sverige? Stockholm: Natur och kultur. 1943. LIBRIS 1208954
	Rusta fredsarmén Stockholm: Kooperativa förbundets bokförlag. 1944. LIBRIS 1208956
	Som handelsresande i Latinamerika Stockholm: Natur och kultur. 1944. LIBRIS 1390580
	Den svenska tändsticksindustriens historia före de stora sammanslagningarna Stockholm. 1945. LIBRIS 8198002
	Ä' vi så'na? Stockholm: Ljus. 1945. LIBRIS 1390581
	Ja, se pojkar Stockholm: Natur och kultur. 1948. LIBRIS 1390579
	Efter levande modell'' Stockholm: Natur o. Kultur. 1949. LIBRIS 1390577

References

External links
 

1887 births
1949 deaths
Swedish male épée fencers
Olympic fencers of Sweden
Fencers at the 1928 Summer Olympics
People from Scania
Gunnar